RAC(Rho family)-alpha serine/threonine-protein kinase is an enzyme that in humans is encoded by the AKT1 gene. This enzyme belongs to the AKT subfamily of serine/threonine kinases that contain SH2 (Src homology 2-like) protein domains. It is commonly referred to as PKB, or by both names as "Akt/PKB".

Function 

The serine-threonine protein kinase AKT1 is catalytically inactive in serum-starved primary and immortalized fibroblasts. AKT1 and the related AKT2 are activated by platelet-derived growth factor. The activation is rapid and specific, and it is abrogated by mutations in the pleckstrin homology domain of AKT1. It was shown that the activation occurs through phosphatidylinositol 3-kinase. In the developing nervous system AKT is a critical mediator of growth factor-induced neuronal survival. Survival factors can suppress apoptosis in a transcription-independent manner by activating the serine/threonine kinase AKT1, which then phosphorylates and inactivates components of the apoptotic machinery.  Mice lacking Akt1 display a 25% reduction in body mass, indicating that Akt1 is critical for transmitting growth-promoting signals, most likely via the IGF1 receptor. Mice lacking Akt1 are also resistant to cancer: They experience considerable delay in tumor growth initiated by the large T antigen or the Neu oncogene. A single-nucleotide polymorphism in this gene causes Proteus syndrome.

History
AKT (now also called AKT1) was originally identified as the oncogene in the transforming retrovirus, AKT8. AKT8 was isolated from a spontaneous thymoma cell line derived from AKR mice by cocultivation with an indicator mink cell line. The transforming cellular sequences, v-akt, were cloned from a transformed mink cell clone and these sequences were used to identify Akt1 and Akt2 in a human clone library. AKT8 was isolated by Stephen Staal in the laboratory of Wallace P. Rowe; he subsequently cloned v-akt and human AKT1 and AKT2 while on staff at the Johns Hopkins Oncology Center.

In 2011, a mutation in AKT1 was strongly associated with Proteus syndrome, the disease that probably affected the Elephant Man.

The name Akt stands for Ak strain transforming. The origins of the Akt name date back to 1928, when J. Furth performed experimental studies on mice that developed spontaneous thymic lymphomas. Mice from three different stocks were studied, and the stocks were designated A, R, and S. Stock A was noted to yield many cancers, and inbred families were subsequently designated by a second small letter (Aa, Ab, Ac, etc.), and thus came the Ak strain of mice. Further inbreeding was undertaken with Ak mice at the Rockefeller Institute in 1936, leading to the designation of the AKR mouse strain. In 1977, a transforming retrovirus was isolated from the AKR mouse. This virus was named Akt-8, the "t" representing its transforming capabilities.

Interactions
AKT1 has been shown to interact with:

 AKTIP, 
 BRAF, 
 BRCA1, 
 C-Raf, 
 CDKN1B,
 CHUK 
 GAB2, 
 HSP90AA1, 
 ILK, 
 KRT10, 
 MAP2K4, 
 MAP3K11, 
 MAP3K8, 
 MAPK14, 
 MAPKAPK2, 
 MARK2, 
 MTCP1, 
 MTOR, 
 NPM1, 
 NR4A1, 
 NR3C4, 
 PKN2, 
 PRKCQ, 
 PDPK1, 
 PLXNA1, 
 TCL1A, 
 TRIB3, 
 TSC1, 
 TSC2,  and
 YWHAZ.

See also
AKT – the AKT family of proteins
AKT2 – the gene for the second member of the AKT family
AKT3 – the gene for the third member of the AKT family
Proteus syndrome

References

Further reading

External links
AKT1 Standards - Learn more about AKT1 Reference Controls
 

EC 2.7.11
Oncogenes
Protein kinases